is a Japanese manga series written and illustrated by Syun Matsuena. It was serialized in Shogakukan's Weekly Shōnen Sunday from December 2014 to June 2017, with its chapters collected in thirteen tankōbon volumes.

Publication
Tokiwa Kitareri!! is written and illustrated by Syun Matsuena. The manga was serialized in Shogakukan's Weekly Shōnen Sunday from December 3, 2014 to June 7, 2017. An animated commercial for the release of the 5th compiled tankōbon volume, produced by J.C.Staff and directed by Kiyotaka Ohata, was released on January 16, 2018. The animated commercial features Kensho Ono as Tokiwa Yasaka, Takahiro Sakurai as Kanata Kusanagi, Eri Kitamura as Rein, Yasuaki Takumi as Deusu Makina, Daiki Yamashita as Haruka Yata and Yuna Yoshino as Aria. Shogakukan collected the manga chapters in thirteen tankōbon volumes, released from February 18, 2015 to July 18, 2017.

Volume list

See also
Shijō Saikyō no Deshi Kenichi, another manga series by the same author
Waza no Tabibito, another manga by the same author
Kimi wa 008, another manga series by the same author

References

Further reading

External links
Official website at Web Sunday 

Action anime and manga
Shogakukan manga
Shōnen manga